Guaranty Trust Co. v. York, 326 U.S. 99 (1945), was a United States Supreme Court case that described how federal courts were to follow state law. Justice Frankfurter delivered the majority opinion further refining the doctrine set forth in Erie Railroad Co. v. Tompkins.

Background
The Erie Doctrine, adopted in 1938, held that while Federal law was determinative in procedural matters, state law should control for substantive matters, thus preventing 'forum shopping' between state and Federal courts.  The defendant in Guaranty Trust argued that the plaintiff's action was time-barred under a New York statute of limitations.  The plaintiff countered that the relevant statute of limitations was "procedural," was not "substantive" law, and therefore was not within the ambit of the doctrine established in the Erie case.

Decision of the Court
The court dispensed with this substantive/procedural distinction and stated that regardless of whether the case was argued in state or federal court, the outcome should be substantially the same.  Thus, the court set forth an "outcome determinative test" for deciding whether a piece of state law must be obeyed in federal courts—if the outcome is substantively the same then the federal court can apply its own rules instead of state rules.  The court held in this case that the New York Statute of limitations be obeyed and the case was reversed and remanded.

This rule was refined first in Byrd v. Blue Ridge Rural Electric Cooperative, Inc. and subsequently defined more specifically in a related series of cases over the next few decades.

See also
 Erie Doctrine
 List of United States Supreme Court cases, volume 326

External links
 
 

United States Supreme Court cases
United States Supreme Court cases of the Stone Court
Conflict of laws case law
Diversity jurisdiction case law
United States Erie Doctrine
1945 in United States case law